The Brigada Especial Operativa Halcón (BEOH; Hawk Special Operations Brigade) is a special operations division of the Buenos Aires Provincial Police in Argentina.

Argentina did not possess a viable counter-terrorist capability until 1978, when it hosted the football World Cup. At that time, the military dictatorship ruling Argentina accepted the possibility that such a widely televised event was a likely forum for a terrorist incident. The result was the formation of a special counter-terrorist team, the Brigada Halcón.

Today, the unit is made up of seventy-five commandos, subdivided into fifteen-man tactical teams. Each team has two snipers, one medic, one negotiator, an explosive ordnance disposal expert, a communications specialist, an intelligence specialist, and eight tactical assaulters.

Initial training is divided into three two-month stages. Skills such as combat shooting, heliborne insertion, HALO/HAHO parachuting, explosives, sniping, intelligence gathering, martial arts, and offensive driving are covered in this period. The unit also handles VIP protection and is also responsible for hijacked aircraft throughout the nation. While many current members are veterans of the Argentine Army, the Brigada Halcón is under the operational control of the federal police, under the direct command of the Buenos Aires Police Department.

Brigada Halcón members use foreign weapons and gear, as well as locally manufactured protective gear and uniforms. 
Weapons include: Bersa Thunder 9, Glock 17, Heckler & Koch MP5, SIG Sauer SIG516 and the SPAS-12 shotgun. For sniping purposes the Heckler & Koch PSG1 is commonly used.

This special operations group was involved in the "Ramallo massacre", when operatives from the Brigada Halcón shot dead one alleged bank robber and his two hostages.

See also
Grupo Alacrán
Grupo Albatros
Grupo Especial de Operaciones Federales
Compañía de Tropas de Operaciones Especiales
Policía Federal Argentina

Provincial law enforcement agencies of Argentina
Non-military counterterrorist organizations